Max Bennet Kruse (born 19 March 1988) is a German professional footballer.

Early years
Kruse was born in Reinbek, Kreis Stormarn, Schleswig-Holstein in the north-eastern periphery of Hamburg. He was raised in Reinbek or in Hamburg.

Club career

Early career

Kruse began his career with hometown club TSV Reinbek before he joined Hamburg-based SV Vier- und Marschlande in summer 1998. After more than seven years there, he was scouted by Werder Bremen in January 2006. On 4 May 2009, he signed a two-year contract with FC St. Pauli. During the 2011–12 2. Bundesliga, Kruse scored 13 goals and provided six assists as FC St. Pauli finished on 62 points in fourth place, missing out on the promotion playoffs on goal difference.

SC Freiburg
Following his successful spell with St. Pauli, Kruse was transferred to Bundesliga side SC Freiburg in the summer of 2012. He made his competitive debut for his new club on 18 August 2012 in a DFB-Pokal match against Victoria Hamburg, which ended in a 2–1 victory as Kruse scored the opening goal and provided the assist for Sebastian Freis's winner. Kruse made his home league debut on 25 August, scoring a goal in Freiburg's 1–1 draw with 1. FSV Mainz 05. He helped Freiburg claim their first win of the Bundesliga season in their third game on 16 September, netting a goal and providing two assists in an enthralling 5–3 defeat of TSG Hoffenheim.

Kruse helped seal an upset win over Schalke on 15 December, providing assists for first half goals to both Jan Rosenthal and Jonathan Schmid in a 3–1 away victory at the Arena AufSchalke. On 16 February, he opened the scoring nine minutes before half time as Freiburg recorded their first win over Kruse's former club Werder Bremen in 11 years with a 3–2 away victory at the Weserstadion.

Kruse scored twice in the second half of Freiburg's Bundesliga clash with Borussia Mönchengladbach on 30 March, securing a 2–0 victory for the club. In his penultimate game with Freiburg on 11 May, he was awarded "Man of the Match" honours as he scored the winning goal in a 2–1 defeat of already relegated Greuther Fürth, all but securing Freiburg an automatic spot in the Europa League group stage for next season.

Borussia Mönchengladbach
Following a standout season with Freiburg, Kruse signed for Borussia Mönchengladbach on a four-year deal in April 2013. He made his debut for the club in Gladbach's loss to 3. Liga side Darmstadt 98 in the first round of the DFB-Pokal on 4 August 2013. He managed to score his first goal for the club on 17 August, firing in Gladbach's first goal in a 3–0 home victory over Hannover 96. Kruse continued his scoring form on 31 August, netting Gladbach's third goal of a 4–1 home victory over his former club Werder Bremen.

Wolfsburg

On 10 May 2015, VfL Wolfsburg signed Kruse on a four-year deal, after activating his release clause of €12 million. He made his debut as a 70th-minute substitute on 1 August in the 2015 DFL-Supercup, and scored in the penalty shootout as Wolfsburg defeated Bayern Munich after a 1–1 draw. On 8 August 2015, Kruse scored his first goal for Wolfsburg in the fourth minute of 4–1 win at Stuttgarter Kickers in the first round of the DFB-Pokal.

Werder Bremen

On 2 August 2016, Kruse re-joined Werder Bremen for a second stint at the club. He scored his first goal for the club in his third league appearance on 3 December 2016, in a 2–1 win against Ingolstadt. On 22 April 2017, he scored four goals in one match for the first time in his career as Werder Bremen came back from 0–1 and 1–2 deficits to defeat Ingolstadt 4–2 and maintain a 10-match unbeaten run.

Ahead of the 2018–19 season, Kruse was chosen as the team's captain by manager Florian Kohfeldt.

As of October 2018, he was the player with the longest active penalty scoring streak – 24 goals. He had not missed a single penalty in six years. His streak started on 7 April 2012.

In May 2019, Kruse announced he would not extend his contract and leave the club following the 2018–19 season.

Fenerbahçe
On 28 June 2019, Kruse joined Fenerbahçe on a three-year deal. On 18 June 2020, he terminated his contract with the club citing unpaid wages.

Union Berlin
On 6 August 2020, Kruse returned to the Bundesliga joining Union Berlin. On 3 October, he scored his first goal for Union and the game's opener in a 4–0 win against Mainz 05. He then scored a penalty and assisted two goals in a 3–1 win against 1899 Hoffenheim on 3 November. During a 5–0 win against Arminia Bielefeld on 7 November 2020, he scored a penalty to equalise Hans-Joachim Abel's Bundesliga record for most penalties scored (16) without a single miss. On the last matchday of the season, he scored a goal in stoppage time to beat RB Leipzig 2–1 and qualify Union Berlin for the 2021–22 UEFA Europa Conference League, their first European football since the 2001–02 UEFA Cup.

Return to Wolfsburg
On 30 January 2022, Kruse re-joined VfL Wolfsburg on a one-and-a-half-year deal. On 28 November 2022, Wolfsburg and Kruse agreed to terminate his contract by mutual consent.

International career
Kruse was a member of the Germany U-19 that competed at the 2007 UEFA U-19 Championship and also featured for the under-21 team.

Kruse received his first call up to the senior squad for a friendly against Ecuador on 29 May 2013 in Boca Raton, Florida. He provided the assist for Lukas Podolski's second goal of the match before being substituted for Dennis Aogo in the 79th minute. The match ended with a 4–2 victory. Kruse scored his first goal for the national team in his second cap, scoring Germany's second goal in a 4–3 defeat to the United States in Washington, D.C. on 2 June, a game which celebrated 100 years of the United States Soccer Federation. Despite Kruse's successful league campaign with Gladbach, he was omitted from the 30-man preliminary squad for the World Cup in Brazil.

During qualification for UEFA Euro 2016, Kruse scored twice in a 7–0 win over Gibraltar on 13 June 2015.

In March 2016 Joachim Löw said that he would not consider Kruse for the national team anymore after Kruse made negative headlines.

2020 Summer Olympics
After not having represented Germany since 2015, Kruse was named as one of Germany's three overage players for the 2020 Tokyo Olympics. Kruse started in Germany's opening match against Brazil where the German team lost 4–2.

Professional poker

Kruse is an avid poker player and made it to the final table, finishing third, at the No-Limit 2–7 Draw Lowball event at the 2014 World Series of Poker on 18 June 2014, taking home $36,494 in prize money. In March 2016, Kruse was fined €25,000 and warned of his future conduct by Wolfsburg after it was revealed that he had lost €75,000 worth of poker winnings in the back seat of a taxi. This incident also caused him to be dropped from the Germany squad.

Personal life
In February 2021, Kruse was one of more than 800 professional footballers, across both the men's and women's game, who signed a petition in German football magazine 11 Freunde to support gay players.

Career statistics

Club

International 

Scores and results list Germany's goal tally first, score column indicates score after each Kruse goal.

Honours
VfL Wolfsburg
 DFL-Supercup: 2015

Individual
 VDV Newcomer of the Season: 2012–13

References

External links

 
 

1988 births
Living people
People from Stormarn (district)
Footballers from Schleswig-Holstein
Association football forwards
German footballers
Germany youth international footballers
Germany under-21 international footballers
Olympic footballers of Germany
Germany international footballers
SV Werder Bremen II players
SV Werder Bremen players
FC St. Pauli players
FC St. Pauli II players
SC Freiburg players
Borussia Mönchengladbach players
VfL Wolfsburg players
Fenerbahçe S.K. footballers
1. FC Union Berlin players
Bundesliga players
2. Bundesliga players
3. Liga players
Regionalliga players
Süper Lig players
Footballers at the 2020 Summer Olympics
German expatriate footballers
German expatriate sportspeople in Turkey
Expatriate footballers in Turkey